The 2008 Women's EuroHockey Junior Championships was the 14th edition of the Women's EuroHockey Junior Championship, an under 21 women's field hockey tournament. It was held in Lille, France, from 20–26 July 2008.

Germany won the tournament for the eighth time after defeating the Netherlands 2–1 in the final. England won the bronze medal, defeating Belarus 5–2 in the third place playoff.

Participating nations
Alongside the host nation, 7 teams competed in the tournament.

Results

Preliminary round

Pool A

Pool B

Classification round

Fifth to eighth place classification
Points earned in the preliminary round are carried over into Pool C.

Pool C

First to fourth place classification

Semi-finals

Third and fourth place

Final

References

Women's EuroHockey Junior Championship
Junior
EuroHockey Junior Championship
field hockey
International women's field hockey competitions hosted by Spain
EuroHockey Junior Championship
Sport in Valencia
EuroHockey Junior Championship